Feriz Beg ( 1495–1515) was a 15th and 16th-century Ottoman military officer, Sanjak-bey of the Sanjak of Scutari and Sanjak of Bosnia.

Origin
Feriz Beg belonged to the Mihaloğlu family, a noted Byzantine family which converted to Islam and was important in the early Ottoman conquests of the Balkans.

Career

Bosnia 
From 1495 to 1496, Feriz was sanjak-bey of the Sanjak of Bosnia. His predecessor Jahja Pasha built a mosque in Sarajevo during his reign in Bosnia (1494–95) but did not provide a water supply to it. According to a legend, he asked his successor, Firuz Bey to do so from Sedrenik to the Jahja Pasha mosque. Firuz Bey did so and also built a public tap in honour of his predecessor.

Scutari 
Feriz Beg held the position of Sanjak-bey of the Sanjak of Scutari from 1496 to 1502. Đurađ Crnojević who controlled the neighboring Principality of Zeta maintained frequent correspondence with other Christian feudal states with the intention of establishing an anti-Ottoman coalition. When his brother Stefan betrayed him to the Ottomans in 1496, Đurađ proposed to accept the suzerainty of the Ottoman Empire and Firuz Bey if they allowed him to remain as governor in Zeta. Firuz Bey refused this proposal and invited Đurađ to either come to Scutari to clarify his anti-Ottoman activities or to flee Zeta. When Firuz Bey attacked Zeta with strong forces in 1496 Đurađ was forced to flee to Venice. In 1497, Firuz Bey captured Grbalj and put Zeta under his effective military control, although it was still part of the Zeta governed by Stefan Crnojević. In 1499, Firuz Bey formally annexed Zeta to the territory of Sanjak of Scutari, after he became suspicious of Stefan because of his connections with Venice. Firuz Bey invited Stefan Crnojević to Skadar where he imprisoned him. It is thought that Stefan probably died in prison since he was never mentioned again in historical sources. In 1499, Firuz Bey organized raids of the territory around Durazzo. It was poorly defended and its population would have surrendered if Firuz Bey had brought more forces. During the same year Firuz Bey joined Isa Pasha and raided the inland of Dalmatia. In 1501, Firuz Bey captured Durazzo. After the Ottoman–Venetian War (1499–1503), Firuz Bey became the Ottoman representative for the region of Cattaro.

Bosnia 
After the death of Skender Pasha in November 1504, Firuz Bey became Sanjak-bey of the Sanjak of Bosnia again. The first mention of the name of the city Sarajevo was in a 1507 letter written by Firuz Bey. In 1509, he built a hammam in Sarajevo and several shops around it as its vakif. He also built a mekteb (elementary school) and madrasa before 1515. This was the oldest madrasa in Sarajevo and one of the oldest in Bosnia. In 1528, the neighborhood of this madrasa developed into a mahala named Mahala of Firuz Beg's Madrasa.

Legacy

Until 1945, one street in Sarajevo was named after Feriz Beg. After Bosnia and Herzegovina seceded from Yugoslavia in 1992, one street is again named after Firuz Bey. His madrasa was destroyed at the end of the 17th century by the army of Eugene of Savoy. His hammam was operational until 1810 when it was closed down by Ottoman authorities because of the poor state of its roof. The building slowly deteriorated and was almost completely destroyed right before the First World War. The site and remains of this hammam are defined as a National Monument of Bosnia and Herzegovina since 2008.

Annotations
He is known as "Firuz Bey" and "Feriz Bey". In Bosnian he is also called Firuz Mihajlović.

References

Sources 
 
 
 
 
 
 
 
 
 
 
 
 
 
 
 
 
 
 
 

15th-century births
Military personnel of the Ottoman Empire
16th-century Ottoman military personnel
15th-century people from the Ottoman Empire
History of Skopje
Ottoman governors of Bosnia
Ottoman governors of Scutari
Year of death unknown